Cape Freeman may refer to:

 Cape Freeman (Balleny Islands)
 Cape Freeman (Graham Land)